is a Japanese light novel series written by Mikage Kasuga and illustrated by Miyama-Zero. It was adapted into an anime television series animated by Madhouse and Studio Gokumi that aired from July to September 2012. Sentai Filmworks licensed the series in 2014 and released the series on December 16, 2014, along with an English dub.

Plot
Suddenly finding himself in the Sengoku period, average high school student Yoshiharu Sagara is about to be killed on the battlefield. He is saved by none other than the man who would later become the respected Toyotomi Hideyoshi, but at the cost of the latter's life. With the course of history altered as a result of these events, Yoshiharu tries to make things right again. Yoshiharu, however, is surprised to discover that the people he meets, the places he encounters, and the historical events he is dragged into are somewhat different than what he remembers from his favorite Sengoku era video game – Nobunaga's Ambition. Yoshiharu soon discovers that, in this version of the Sengoku period, Nobunaga Oda does not exist – instead being replaced by a young woman named Nobuna Oda who holds his position as a daimyō. Yoshiharu begins working under Nobuna's command, who nicknames him , with hopes of correcting the course of history and finding his way back home to the present-day world.

Characters

Oda Clan

 A modern-day teenager who finds himself in an alternative version of the Sengoku period where some of the famous warlords of the era are female. Taking on the historical role of Hideyoshi Toyotomi, who died while saving Yoshiharu's life, Yoshiharu swears to fulfill the dead man's dream of becoming a feudal lord and becoming popular with the ladies by using his knowledge from the videogame, Nobunaga's Ambition to foresee future events and help Nobuna in her quest to unite and conquer Japan and to hopefully change her real life counterpart's fate in the Incident at Honno-ji. Others also refer to him by the nickname "Saru" ("Monkey") much to his chagrin, and he becomes Nobuna's punching bag whenever she gets mad or emotional.

The daimyō of Owari. She has a tsundere attitude. Known by her enemies as the "Big Fool of Owari", she is a brilliant and ambitious teenage girl who plans to conquer and unite Japan to strengthen the nation and allow it to stand on equal ground with advanced European nations. An admirer of foreign culture and items, their influences inspire Nobuna's ambition. Throughout the series she is troubled by her position of leadership. As a person who is kind at heart, she seeks to rule with benevolence, fairness and kindness. However, she often finds herself in positions where she must make decisions that could compromise the integrity of her idealism. She begins to develop romantic feelings for Yoshiharu, which culminates with them entering into a secret love relationship later in the light novels. She also gets angry with Jūbei's inability to read the atmosphere as well as her constant interruptions whenever Nobuna and Yoshiharu try to share some quality time alone.

Also known as Jūbei, she is a brilliant tactician and strategist - although her strategies are renowned for their ruthlessness and cruelty. Originally a loyal and dutiful general of the Saitō clan, she later becomes one of Nobuna's most important generals after Dōsan Saitō, leader of the Saitō clan, allies himself with Nobuna. Due to her pride and ambition, Jūbei wants nothing more than to be acknowledged by others, especially by Nobuna - who she admires very much. She has the unfortunate inability to read the mood and atmosphere in the room and has interrupted Nobuna and Yoshiharu's romantic moments on more than one occasion under the pretext of protecting Nobuna (as her relationship with Yoshiharu is supposed to be a secret). After saving Yoshiharu's life at Kanegasaki, Jūbei begins to develop feelings for him, even to the extent of trying to marry him, even though she would constantly deny her feelings towards him until the events of volume 11. This dismays Nobuna to the point she considers executing Jūbei. During the events on volume 11, Mitsuhide finally came to admit her true feelings to him, even though the relationship between Nobuna and Yoshiharu has been exposed to Japan, she would still try to marry him, despite what has been revealed to the public. Because of Jūbei's role in the death of the real life Oda Nobunaga, Yoshiharu tries his best to avoid the Incident at Honno-ji as he is aware of everything that takes place before and after said incident.

Nicknamed Riku, she is a general serving under Nobuna. Originally, she was an aide to Nobuna's younger brother, Nobukatsu, but her true loyalty lay with Nobuna. Due to an agreement that was made after one of Nobukatsu's failed rebellions, she officially became one of Nobuna's retainers. She wears a steel breastplate that accentuates the shape of her bosom and is easily angered by those who stare at it. She develops a desire to be more feminine when she realizes that many warriors see and fear her as "Demon Shibata", going so far as to have Yoshiharu give her some dubious advice. After the war between the Oda clan and the Asai-Asakura alliance, she is made the daimyō of Echizen.

Nicknamed Manchiyo, she serves as the Oda faction tactician. She enjoys teasing others, and has a habit of assigning "points" to indicate her approval or disapproval of anything from battle strategies to bad jokes. She is considered to be the big sister of the group and cares for Nobuna greatly. After the war between the Oda clan and the Asai-Asakura alliance, she governs over Wakasa and Nobuna has her oversee the construction of the now famous Azuchi Castle.

Also known as "Danjō", she is a daimyō, but also one of Nobuna's retainers. A practitioner of witchcraft, she is also called "The Witch of Civil Wars" and is able to change her pipe into a spear or a sword and can use teleportation and illusion magic. She is despised by most of Japan's daimyōs due to her mysterious witchcraft. As a result of being hated, she allied with the only group of people who would have her - the Miyoshi Three - and sought to burn the country to the ground. During the Battle at Kiyomizu Temple however, Danjō recognized that many of Nobuna's allies were people like her, hated and with no place in the country. Finally finding people who would accept her, she surrendered and joined the Oda faction as a strategist. Danjō believes that Nobuna will have to become a "demon" to unite Japan and temporarily attempted to steer her in that direction, much to the disapproval of Nobuna's other retainers. However, she is genuinely loyal to the "Fool of Owari" and respects her rather naive and hopeful dreams. She was acquainted with Saitō Dōsan in the past.
Danjō betrays Nobuna in Volume 9, when she plans to destroy the Todai Temple in Yamato, killing any monk who stands in her way using her war elephants and drugging troops, before marching to Kyoto and attempting to kill Nobuna. Despite her betrayal, Nobuna can't bring herself to hate her, as she still sees her as a mother figure. When Nobuna confronts her, she revealed that she only caused that rebellion to make the monks unite against her and have Nobuna appear as a hero. She also tells Nobuna of the plans of Konoe Sakihisa and reveals that she plans to die at the Tamonyama Castle in order to bear the blame of Nobuna's past actions and restore her goddaughter's good name. Despite refusing to leave her godmother, Nobuna reluctantly agrees to her last request, promising not become a demon lord. Danjō then commits suicide by setting Tamonyama Castle on fire. At dawn, Nobuna sees a comet, as Danjō predicted, that was called "Danjō’s star".

A ninja who stutters and bites her tongue whenever she has to speak extensively. She serves under Yoshiharu, having sworn fealty to her former master Kinoshita Toukichirou and pledged to find a lord and be promoted together. She is also the leader of a task force of militiamen, brigands, and hunters who adore her and are willing to lay their lives on the line for her. Very little is known about her past as she does not talk about herself much. Due her small build, she is a very capable spy and is able to infiltrate prisons and castles with little trouble and she is also able to hold her own in a fight.

Nicknamed Inuchiyo, she is a young girl who is one of the best spear wielders of the Oda faction. She is also part of Yoshiharu's loyal followers and serves as his personal bodyguard. Unlike her anime counterpart, in the light novel she does not initially wear her tiger headdress and she is temporarily exiled after cutting down Nobukatsu's page but returns during the Battle of Mino.

A highly intelligent strategist who serves Yoshiharu directly and, through serving him, serves Nobuna. Initially a general of the Saitō clan, she remained loyal to the clan even after Yoshitatsu overthrew his father. She hates meaningless bloodshed and prefers using strategies that cause the fewest casualties possible. Hanbē, being a timid girl, is afraid of the overbearing Yoshitatsu and tries to perform her duties as a Saitō clan strategist without having to enter into physical proximity of him. Yoshitatsu, however, sees this as treason and has her uncle arrested to force her into appearing before him. Hanbē later defects to the Oda clan after Yoshiharu and his allies rescue her and her uncle from Yoshitatsu. Due to how kind Yoshiharu is to her, she swears her loyalty to him rather than Nobuna, but is willing to help him achieve Nobuna's ambition. As an Onmyōji, she can summon powerful Shikigami familiars. She suffers from poor health and is very frail and delicate as a result. Her health slowly begins to decline during the Asai-Asakura war and worsens right before the Battle of Harima. Because of this, Yoshiharu fears that she will eventually succumb to the fate of her real life counterpart.

Hanbē's double and familiar. He is protective of his master against those who threaten her. As a Kitsune, he is a powerful and intelligent spirit. He foretells that Yoshiharu will have "women trouble" which comes true many times throughout the story. He overhears Yoshiharu's meeting with Hanbei, Kanbei, and Goemon in which he informs them of Nobuna and Shikanosuke's real life fates. Zenki sacrifices himself (as he was already to weak to reform if he was destroyed) to allow Yoshiharu rescue Kanbei. Before returning to the afterlife, he calls Yoshiharu his friend, as he made him feel like a living person for the first time in many centuries. His spirit spoke to Yoshiharu before finally disappearing.

A childish girl and Yoshiharu's neighbor who treats Yoshiharu as her older brother. This relationship was arranged as a joke to fulfill Nobuna's promise to Yoshiharu to give him the most beautiful girl in the land". Nobuna also uses Nene to keep Yoshiharu in check and to keep him from flirting with other women.

A female samurai and scout of the Oda clan.

Another female samurai and scout of the Oda clan.

The daimyō of Ise and a retainer of Nobuna. She is almost identical to Himiko, but their personalities are opposites. Like Himiko, she also has certain psychic powers; in her case she can force anyone to answer any question she asks truthfully by touching the forehead of said person. She is also a Ninja and apparently dislikes battles on land. She also has an army of female pirates who are willing to do almost anything for her.

The leader of the female-only Kuki Pirates and a retainer of Takigawa Kazumasu. She is apparently on an age where her subordinates worry about her single marital status.

The Head of the Kuroda Clan, also called the Nanban Samurai and Don Simon. As a former Onmyōji, she's an expert in western knowledge and machinery. She believes she has a way to return Yoshiharu to his own time. Kanbei believes in Nobuna's goal of taking control of Japan and that she can achieve it. She also believes that Yoshiharu is a hindrance to this goal. This is because Yoshiharu spared Imagawa Yoshimoto, who should have died and then later became the shōgun, which caused the Oda forces to clash with the Ashikage shogunate's surviving members. She is assigned by Nobuna to be Yoshiharu's second strategist, much to her chagrin and helps him to ally the Oda Clan with the Harima Daimyo and so stop the advance of the Mōri clan. Eventually, she comes to realise that she is not as capable a strategist as she believed herself to be, easily getting herself and Yoshiharu caught in a trap set by the enemy.
After Yoshiharu informs to her, Goemon and Hanbei about the Incident at Hannon-ji, she begins to understand the truth about why Nobuna's plans were doomed and comes to admire Yoshiharu's resolve, noticing that he's got too much on his plate as it is, she decides to avoid telling him about Hanbei's illness and resolves to do something about that herself instead. She becomes so strong in this resolve that she ignores all warnings and goes to meet with Ukita Naoie in the hopes of bringing him to their side to relieve Hanbei's stress, as their plan involved forcing him to surrender anyway. This fails, of course, and she is imprisoned for several days with the condition of her freedom being Yamanaka Shikanosuke's surrender before the Mōri Clan's arrival or she will be executed. She's rescued by Yoshiharu and after she and Hanbei begin to recover from their respective conditions, they become nearly as close as sisters.

A former retainer of the Amako clan and an enemy of the Mōri clan, who're responsible for destroying the Amako clan and is the leader of the Amako's Heroes. Due to the many betrayals she had suffered in the past, she has great difficulty in trusting Yoshiharu's resolve to keep her from surrendering herself to the Mōri c, since Zenki, who overheard Yoshiharu's meeting with Hanbei, Kanbei, and Goemon, revealed to her her real life counterpart's fate but upon seeing Yoshiharu's determination and sincere care for her, she accepts him as her master and becomes his retainer. Due to her suggestive talk and behavior toward suffering and pain, Yoshiharu suspects she is a masochist.

Nobuna and Nobukatsu's mother. She has a very estranged relationship with her daughter, which worsens even more when she thinks Nobuna killed Nagamasa Asai.

The Oda clan's latest addition, who suddenly appears to help Nobuna and Yoshiharu decide the best strategy against the threat of the Mōri clan, the Honbyo Temple, and Uesugi Kenshin. She once was a hostage of the Oda clan, but came to admire Nobuna and became her sworn-sister. She dislikes Yoshiharu for his closeness towards Nobuna. Ujisato proposes that the only way they can defeat so many enemies is for Nobuna to become a living god, like Kenshin, to ensure the devotion of their followers. She believes that Yoshiharu's purpose has been fulfilled and must leave Nobuna's side to ensure she can realize her dream, despite the objections of both. Before leaving she gives Nobuna the Yasakani no Magatama and mentions that she will eventually need the divine power of the three relics. Although Nobuna and Yoshiharu believe she's too innocent about her intentions, Kazumasu suspects she has a hidden motive.

Saitō Clan

The daimyō of Mino. Known as the Viper of Mino, he is a politically ambitious man. Originally, he wanted to start a war with Nobuna, but after hearing her dreams and Yoshiharu's explanation of what he will be known in the future, he allies with Oda faction by making Nobuna his heir. Unfortunately, this angered his son Yoshitatsu who launches rebellion against him, forcing Dōsan, his daughter Kichō and Mitsuhide to exile to Owari. After the defeat of his son, however, he was able to retake his position as daimyō of Mino. As a father figure to her, Nobuna cares about Dōsan who she considers her stepfather. Although he was supposed to die by the hand of his son, Yoshitatsu, Yoshiharu convinced him to flee thus saving his life. Later in the light novels, he begins to suffer from an unknown illness presumably Cancer. He succumbs to his illness during Nobuna's battle against Shingen Takeda causing the former great grief. Only Yoshiharu was able to console her proving that Dōsan's trust in the young man was not in vain.

Dōsan's daughter. When Yoshitatsu rebelled against his father Dōsan, Dōsan hastily sent his daughter Kichō and Mitsuhide to Nobuna in Owari for their sake of safety.

Matsudaira (Tokugawa) Clan

The daimyō of Mikawa and the future Ieyasu Tokugawa. She was merely a gentle and soft minor vassal of the Imagawa until the Battle of Okehazama. After the Imagawa were defeated at Okehazama, she gained independence and formed an alliance with Nobuna. She is the only character in the series to wear eye glasses which were later used as a joke in the light novels, and she's got a timid and humble personality as well, with her dress being like that of a raccoon. She and Nobuna were once childhood friends, when she was a hostage of the Oda clan for a while, and she always both fears and respects Nobuna, and always intends to help Nobuna accomplish her dream of conquest, both wherever and whenever possible.

A ninja serving under Motoyasu. As his master served Yoshimoto, he also served under the Imagawas. However he is more loyal to his master when he allows Yoshiharu to report the location of Yoshimoto's army to Nobuna so that his master will no longer be a vassal of the Imagawas. During the Retreat at Kanegasaki, Hanzō pretended to kill Yoshiharu, under the pretext that having Yoshiharu captured, killed and have his severed head on display would be too shameful, in order to fool their enemies into thinking he was dead.

Imagawa Shogunate

Former daimyō of Suruga and current shōgun of Japan. Yoshimoto was considered the most likely one to conquer Japan due to possessing the larger force and being related to the Ashikaga clan, the ruling shōguns during that era. However, due to her arrogance, her main army was defeated at Okehazama when the Oda clan launched a surprise attack. Yoshimoto was spared from being killed thanks to Yoshiharu's intervention. Later, Nobuna made Yoshimoto the new shōgun as her figurehead to legitimatize her claim for Kyoto after the Ashikagas went into exile. She is quite attracted to Yoshiharu, though he shows no particular care for this, despite being uncommonly hormonal otherwise. Her hobby is playing soccer or Kemari (蹴鞠), when she'not in battle, often using Motoyasu as a goal keeper.

Asai Clan

The daimyō of Ōmi. A manipulative young woman, she is forced to hide her gender because her father, Hisamasa, refuses to accept a woman as a daimyō. She attempts to coerce Nobuna into an alliance by marriage (so she can take credit for Nobuna's victories as her "husband") by threatening to ally the Asai clan with Nobuna's enemies. However, her various attempts to gain leverage against the Oda fail due to Yoshiharu and his allies. After being told by her father that she would not be allowed back at home until she got married, a desperate Nagamasa agrees to an alliance with Nobuna with no strings attached. The Oda seal the alliance by giving Nagamasa, Nobuna's younger sister, Oichi (in reality Nobuna's younger brother, Nobusumi, disguised as a girl), as her bride. When Nobusumi and Nagamasa discover each other's true gender, they fall deeply in love. This changes Nagamasa's opinion of Nobuna Oda greatly. Previously an enemy and rival of the Oda, she refuses to fight Nobuna at Kanegasaki after the Oda attack the Asakura clan, an ally of the Asai. As a result, Hisamasa imprisons Nagamasa to take over the clan and joins Yoshikage Asakura against Nobuna. Nagamasa later faces Nobusumi in battle but spares his life due to her lingering feelings for him. After Nobuna's victory against Asai Asakura, Hisamasa commits seppuku but not before leaving a message for his daughter to live her life as normal girl. During the Oda clan's celebration with only its key retainers present, Nobuna presents Nagamasa as her sister in-law, Oichi, the name Nobusumi used when he was disguised as a girl and she lives with her husband free of her burdens at last. It is later revealed that she is pregnant with Nobusumi's child.
//

Nobuna's younger brother. Convinced by his advisers that his older sister is not fit to be the leader of their clan, he attempted a rebellion only for his sister to peacefully crush it. As a show of gratitude for having his life spared thanks to Yoshiharu, he changed his name to Nobusumi Tsuda and officially renounced the position of the daiymō of Owari. He is protected by a group of female bodyguards, all of whom are in love with him. He later unwillingly becomes a part of his sister's plot when she sends him, disguised as a girl and using the name Oichi, to be married to Nagamasa Asai. Later they fall in love with one another. During the war against Asai Asakura, Nobusumi faces Nagamasa in battle but is spared (albeit injured) due to her conflicting feelings for him and her clan. After the war, the two are finally reunited as lovers when Nobuna takes Nagamasa as her sister in-law under the name of Oichi, Nobusumi's old name when disguised as a girl, and she now lives with him. His wife later reveals that she's pregnant, much to Yoshiharu's jealousy and surprise.

Christian Clan

The daimyō of Oushu and the future . She is a companion and bodyguard of Louise Frois and an ally of the Oda clan. Possessing heterochromia, she also has a case of chuunibyou (8th grader adolescent delusions), believing her red eye has special powers which is hidden under an eyepatch. Like Nobuna, she also has an estranged relationship with her mother.
Bontenmaru is also the main character of the Oda Nobuna no Yabō light novel spin off Jakigan Ryū Masamune which focuses on her history and activities during the events of the main novel.

Masamune's aide and caretaker. She usually has to deal with Masamune's antics and tries to keep her under control. Due to her androgynous appearance, she is often mistaken for a boy much to her displeasure.

A Portuguese nun and missionary. She has come to Japan to help the sick and defenseless. Noted for extremely large breasts, which she believes are sinful due to how others react to them, however, Sagura Yoshiharu tells her a little of the future he comes from to convince her that she is not a sinner. She has great confidence and hope in Yoshiharu, since they both share same dream, inspiration and desire for establishing a peaceful world for the people, and is willing to don her armour to help out, when Yoshiharu's group is in a big pinch or grave danger. She later accompanies Yoshiharu to Honbyō temple, where they use skits in order to win the trust of the temple's residents. She's the female version of Luís Fróis, who'd befriended the real life Oda Nobunaga.
Organtino
He is an Italian missionary who first appears alongside the knight Giovanna L'Ortese on Ise Spanish Isle. He later affiliates himself with the Oda Clan due to hearing about Nobuna's openness and good treatment of foreign cultures. He is Louise's junior and looks up to her.
Giovanna L'Ortese
A knight of the honorable St. John Knights from Spain. She initially was seen as an enemy by Takigawa Kazumasu and her pirate subordinate Kuki Yoshitaka, but, after duelling Sagara Yoshiharu, it was revealed that her intentions were actually not hostile and she becomes a valuable ally against Takeda Shingen. She believes that eating and sleeping are the two most important things to a knight, she will take the opportunity to do either of these things when it comes up and has a habit of blatantly ignoring conversations around her while eating.

A Christian Daiymo and lord of Takatsuki, Osaka who aided the Oda Faction during the Battle at Kiyomizu Temple.

A Christian merchant and samurai who aided the Oda Faction during the Battle at Kiyomizu Temple. He is also father of Augustine Konishi.

Miyoshi Triumvirate (Miyoshi Three) Clan

An imperial adviser (kampaku)and one of the leaders of the Miyoshi Triumvirate (Miyoshi Three) Clan. He was a manipulative politician who planned to take control of Japan by overthrowing the Ashikaga Shogunate with his allies and using his position to become Empress Himiko's regent. However, his plans come under threat by the Oda Faction led by Nobuna Oda whom he hates as he views her as lowly country noble. As his plans to destroy the Oda Faction failed, he slowly loses his sanity and in a desperate attempt to finally kill Nobuna, he betray his allies by setting Mount Hiei, where he and his allies are, on fire. He attempts to kill Nobuna by himself but is defeated by her and killed, crushed by the collapsing Enryaku-ji temple.
In the light novels however, he neither fights Nobuna nor dies at Mt. Hiei but he retains his manipulative and arrogant personality. He is verbally defeated by Nobuna and in order to remain alive, she forces him to serve as a messenger in order to subjugate the second rebellion of the Honbyo Temple that he helped provoke. The other condition Nobuna imposes him is that after she unifies Japan he will be forced to, either adopt Yoshiharu and allow him to inherit the Fujiwara clan, or simply pass him the title of Imperial adviser, disinherit him and allow him to take a new name. Despite hating the idea, believing he's protecting Himiko, he reluctantly agrees, but replies that the Fujiwara Clan needs time to decide. He is clearly shocked when he meets Kazumasu. He and Sougyu become terrified when they learn that the Murakami Navy is going to attack Sakai, now the only thing they can do is believe in Nobuna.

A rich merchant from Sakai and a former leader of the Miyoshi Three. He joined Sakihisa's conspiracy hoping to gain a profit from it. After being betrayed by Konoe, however, he made peace with the Oda Faction.

The Buddhist Head monk of Hiei mountain temple and one of former leaders of the Miyoshi Three. He hated foreigners and joined Sakihisa's conspiracy to expel them from Japan for spreading Christianity. As Konoe lit Mount Hiei, a sacred center of Buddhism in Japan, to kill Nobuna, Shoukakuin finally recognized the madness of the imperial adviser. The desperate monk fled the mountain but was captured by Oda forces. Nevertheless, he was released since the Oda tried to save the mountain temple with magic and his prayers would be helpful in doing so. Shortly afterwards Louise Frois joined Gōsei in praying, much to his surprise. Recognizing the benevolent nature of the missionary, the Head monk hesitantly accepted that Christianity was not generally evil and made peace with the Oda and the Christians.

A general formerly working for the Miyoshi Three. He was one of the figurehead leaders of the alliance, but after being defeated at Kyoto, he and his brothers deserted and fled to Shikoku.

Another former general of the Miyoshi Three and Masayasu's brother.

Asakura clan

The daimyō of Echizen and a former ally of the Miyoshi Three. Yoshikage desires the most beautiful women in Japan, especially Nobuna. After Konoe betrayed his allies at Hiei mountain, Yoshikage canceled his alliance with the Miyoshi Three. Nevertheless, he is still at war with the Oda Faction. He is called the era's Hikaru Genji and tends to go to his own world when someone mentions him. During the climax of the Asai-Asakura war, he commits suicide when he realizes his defeat and Nobuna's forces burn his prized paintings.

Twin sister generals who serve under the Asakura clan. Beautiful but blood thirsty warriors, the Magara twins wields giant Zanbatō swords. Although famous for their martial arts, they were defeated by Katsuie Shibata during the Burning of Hiei Mountain, but spared from being killed.

An Onmyōji at the service of the Asakura Clan and the current leader of the Tsuchimikado clan. He is cruel and quite overconfident, stating the entire reason he appeared was to take Yoshiharu's head for the Azai and Asakura clan's and their alliance. After being defeated by Hanbei, or more specifically Zenki, he began crying and ran away, returning only when Hanbei was rendered powerless and his confidence in defeating her was renewed.

Takeda Clan

The daimyō of Kai. Called the "Tiger of Kai", she is one of the strongest generals of the Sengoku period and rivals with the equally renowned Uesugi Kenshin. In her private and personal life, she goes by the name Katsuchiyo and is seen as a lighthearted and cheerful person. She later develops an interest in Yoshiharu, after hearing that he is described to be the "man from the heavens", going so far as to want him to become the "alpha male" of the Takeda clan by having him impregnate the clan's generals including Shingen herself hinting she has feelings for him too. She later enters into a temporary alliance with Nobuna.

Shingen's younger sister.

Uesugi Clan

The Daimyo of Echigo. She is a powerful warrior and viewed as a living god, nicknamed both "The Dragon of Echigo" and "The God of War." As a devout and pious figure, she leads her "Army of Justice" to fight for those who are oppressed and end the chaos of the Sengoku period. Being the rival of Shingen, they have fought each other many times on the battlefield.

Kenshin's younger sister.

A gifted military advisor of the Uesugi Clan.

Hōjō Clan

 The daimyō of Sagami. Nicknamed the "Lion of Sagami", she is an ally of Shingen Takeda but dislikes her immensely. Ujiyasu prefers defensive battles that she knows she can win, much to the annoyance of Shingen. She tries to assassinate both Nobuna and Shingen once she realizes both are defenseless, but is stopped by Yoshiharu who accidentally sees that she has a blue mole in her butt, so as to say a "Mongolian spot." She swears vengeance on Yoshiharu for that reason but prefers to wait for the right opportunity. She is mocked by Shingen as the "Washing Board of Sagami" because of her flat chest.

The leader of the "Nyankōsō" cult, a group that adores cats like gods. She believes that the world is full of sadness because of the war caused by the samurai and that laughter is the best way to bring peace. She has the ambition of uniting the whole country under the Nyankōsō and is willing to arm her followers for that purpose, even if that means waging war with the Oda clan. She is half human, half Nekomata, which means she has the ears and tail of a cat, but that also means she is capable of regenerating from a bullet shot. According to Magoichi, Kennyo's biggest weakness is catnip. When Nobuna demands Yoshiharu to be returned to Oda Clan, she refuses and only allows her to negotiate once she makes a successful skit. To decide who keeps Yoshiharu she challenges Nobuna and the Oda retainers to a nanban soccer match. Despite the advantage of having cat-like speed and agility, she loses the game because of her love for comedy, the moment Motoyasu loses her glasses at the last minute of the game, she and her followers begin laughing uncontrollably, which gives Nobuna and Yoshiharu the opportunity to score the victory goal. After losing she accepts disarming her forces, acting as a middleman between the Oda and Takeda forces and agreeing with Nobuna to return Yoshiharu to her side. Both the Oda and the Honbyo Temple's people agree on playing an annual soccer match to relieve the stress and renew peace, vowing to win next time. She suddenly finds herself losing her powers and becoming a normal girl, so her younger sister Kyonya, expels her from the Nyankousou Temple, while she wages war against the Oda Clan under the invitation of Yoshiaki Ashikaga.
Kyonya
Kennyo's younger sister, who's just like her has cat ears and tail. She hated how her sister changed thanks to Magoichi Saika and never got interested in the skits or soccer games. Unlike her sister who let her emotions controlled her decisions, she's cold and serious. After her sister loses her powers, she expels her from the Honbyo Temple and calls to arms the followers of the Nyankousu, causing a mass rebellion on many fronts that put the Oda on a very dire situation. She allies herself with the Mori Clan and hires the Saika Clan to ensure her victory against Nobuna. Magoichi realizes that she doesn't care about how many people sacrifices their lives for her, as she is seen as an absolute authority by her followers, if it means defeating Nobuna and forcefully uniting the country under the Nyankousu.

The leader of the Saika Ikki, a mercenary and an ally of the "Nyankōsō" and later is hired by the Date clan. While she doesn't believe in the "Nekogami" she enjoys making skits with Kennya. Magoichi takes a liking to Yoshiharu and even wants him to become her husband. She participates in the Soccer Match to decide who keeps Yoshiharu and is blocked by Goemon, Inuchiyo and Kazumasu. She is an expert at shooting with her arquebus named Yatagarasu and that also means she is deadly at kicking the soccer ball. She nearly kills Yoshiharu when she accidentally shoots Yatagarasu in a moment of acting like the tsukkomi of a skit. Magoichi and the Saika Ikki help the Date Clan to retreat from the siege of the Odawara castle to ensure that the Hōjō clan doesn't pursue them. Once the Honbyo Temple declares war against the Oda Clan again, she and her clan are hired to assist the Murakami Navy in the battle. Despite wanting to resign and join Kennyo and the Oda, her followers convince her otherwise. She reluctantly agrees on fighting against Nobuna and says she's gonna kill her, but in her thoughts she hates herself for being so good at shooting. She also dislikes how Kyonya is willing to sacrifice the lives of her followers in this senseless conflict and fails to persuade her of sending the devotees home, knowing the lack of experience in the battlefield will prove fatal for many of them.

The newest aide of Nobuna, in secret she is a spy of Konoe ordered to kill her when the timing is right. She uses lies to make Nobuna believe she can't trust no one and even tried to convince her of executing all her aides in the Oda Clan after Hisahide Matsunaga betrayed her, but when she lied about Yoshiharu and Yamanaka Shikanosuke being in a relationship, her jealousy beats her depression, and when Senchiyo tries to deceive her even more, the sudden appearance of Yoshimoto Imagawa ruined her scheme. Yoshimoto knocks her out with a swift soccer kick. Then she is forced by Nobuna into going with the vanguard of the army against Hisahide. When she tries to kill Nobuna from behind during the chaos, she is stopped by Goemon and taken away from the battlefield. She is then interrogated by Nobuna and Hisahide but refuses to reveal her employer. Hisahide then kills her with a special potion which stops her heart and reveals that she is a Fuma ninja sent by the Hōjō Clan. Her body is later burned alongside Hisahide's when Tamonyama Castle is set on fire. It is later revealed that, thanks to the power of the Ranjatai, her body and soul fused with those of Hisahide's, creating a new person, as Matsunaga felt pity for the young ninja. She now calls herself "Flower Princess" Kashinkoji, "a resident from the world of dreams".

Mōri Clan

The 14th Ashikaga shōgun and Yoshimoto's rival. Yoshiaki was the younger sister of Yoshiteru Ashikaga, the 13th Ashikaga Shogun before the Miyoshi Three launches a coup d'état against her brother. Fearing for their safety, Yoshiteru and his sister fled to China in exile and relinquishes his title. Upon learning that her cousin Yoshimoto became the new shōgun and the Miyoshi Three were defeated by Nobuna Oda, Yoshiaki, angered that Yoshimoto "stole" the Shogunate, returns to the Japan to claim back what is rightfully hers. Declaring herself as the 14th Ashikaga shōgun after having her brother give up the title, Yoshiaki returns to Japan with the help of the Mōri clan and seeks help from the Oda faction's rivals to regain the shogunate.

The daimyō of Bizen and an ally of the Mōri clan and Yoshiaki Ashikaga. He serves the Mōri Clan to ensure his position, otherwise his lands are going to be confiscated, and he forced to commit seppuku. Treacherous and dangerous, he used many devious schemes to acquire his position. He is also an expert sniper. He often prefers to manipulate his enemies and lure them into various traps while using many strategies that stop the defense of Harima, frustrating and infuriating Yoshiharu, Hanbei and Kanbei. While he manipulates women and kills men without hesitation, apparently he would never hurt a female. He captures Kanbei and almost forces her to surrender, but she refuses his offer. He threatens to execute Kanbei unless they surrender Yamanaka Shikanosuke, but Yoshiharu and Hanbei know that he won't fulfill his promise and he is just waiting for the reinforcements of the Mōri clan to arrive. Yukinaga Konishi believes the last piece of benevolence he has in his person goes to his daughter Hideie.

Naoie's only daughter. She's the only one that treated Kanbei with kindness during her time as captive. She even helps Yoshiharu rescue Kanbei from her father, as she doesn't want him to lose the humanity he has left and become a "demon".

A Christian girl from Sakai that serves as bodyguard for Hideie under Naoie's orders, apparently because he wants his daughter to become a better ruler than he was.

Younger sister of Motoharu, she's a famous general known to keep her cool no matter the situation. She is an ally of Yoshiaki Ashikaga in her fight against Nobuna alongside her sister. She always tries to keep her sister Motoharu calm, and don't let her emotions get the best of her. The teachings of her father, Mōri Motonari, influenced her deeply and, just like Nobuna, she believes Japan must be unified and be able to compete with European countries. She feels curiosity whenever Nobuna will become a savior or a destroyer.

Older sister of Takakage, she is the Mōri Clan's number one leader when it comes to battles, and is nicknamed "The Valiant General". She is also an ally of Yoshiaki Ashikaga in her fight against Nobuna alongside her sister Takakage. She wishes to defeat Yamanaka Shikanosuke no matter what because of the humiliation she caused to the Mōri clan when she escaped their custody using the excuse of needing to go to the toilet to escape. Unlike Takakage, she isn't a very deep thinker and only wants to see how things will go through, so she has a deep trust in her sister. However, when she's not on the battlefield, she tends to fantasize with "beautiful generals", and Takakage compares her to a Fujoshi.

The Murakami Navy's leader, called "Pirate King", he's an ally of the Mori twins, despite remaining semi-independent. He was very close to Mōri Takamoto, Takakage and Motoharu's older brother and he sees himself as a protector for both sisters. His fame and prowess on the battlefield are so great that even Yoshitaka Kuki fears they will not be able to defeat him.

Other characters

The current Empress of Japan and direct descendant of Himiko, the first Empress of Japan. She has inherited psychic powers from her ancestor, thus gaining the ability to read a person's heart and mind by touching him or her. Hence, when she meets Yoshiharu and inspects along with him the death and devastation in Kyoto, which is caused by endless wars, she holds Yoshiharu in great confidence and regards. Since she's still a child, her regent, Sakihisa Konoe, uses this to his advantage to gain power for himself.

A merchant from Sakai and leader of the leader of the Egoushuu, the merchants who control Sakai. An old friend of Nobuna's father, he is willing to help Nobuna anything involving finance. He also owns a monopoly in the takoyaki market.

Media

Light novel
The Ambition of Oda Nobuna began as a light novel series written by Mikage Kasuga and illustrated by Miyama-Zero. Volume 1–10 and a spin-off novel were published between August 15, 2009 and March 16, 2013 by SB Creative under their GA Bunko imprint. On April 19, 2014, volume 11 was published by Fujimi Shobo under their Fujimi Fantasia Bunko imprint and all further releases were published this way.

Manga
A manga adaptation written by Mikage Kasuga and illustrated by Futago Minazuki was serialized in Kadokawa Shoten's Comp Ace magazine from July 2011 to June 2014 and the serial chapters were collected into 6 volumes. The first volume was released in February 2012 and the last volume was released in August 2014.

Anime

An anime television series adaptation animated by Madhouse and Studio Gokumi based on volumes 1 to 4 of the novels aired from July 9 to September 24, 2012 on TV Tokyo. The anime is directed by Yūji Kumazawa, scripted by Masami Suzuki, and composed by Yasuharu Takanashi.

References

External links
Official light novel website  at SoftBank Creative 
Official light novel website at Fujimi Shobo 
Official Anime Website 
Official Anime Twitter Website 

2009 Japanese novels
2011 manga
2012 anime television series debuts
Anime and manga based on light novels
Cultural depictions of Oda Nobunaga
Cultural depictions of Toyotomi Hideyoshi
GA Bunko
Historical anime and manga
Isekai anime and manga
Isekai novels and light novels
Kadokawa Dwango franchises
Kadokawa Shoten manga
Light novels
Madhouse (company)
Romantic comedy anime and manga
Seinen manga
Sengoku period in fiction
Sentai Filmworks
Studio Gokumi